René Gonin (born 28 December 1969) is a Swiss rower. He competed in the men's double sculls event at the 1992 Summer Olympics.

References

External links
 

1969 births
Living people
Swiss male rowers
Olympic rowers of Switzerland
Rowers at the 1992 Summer Olympics
Place of birth missing (living people)